Paisley Corners is an unincorporated community in Bond County, Illinois, United States. Paisley Corners is located on Illinois Route 127, northwest of Greenville.

References

Unincorporated communities in Bond County, Illinois
Unincorporated communities in Illinois